Nea Mesangala or Nea Mesagala, often just called Mesangala, is one of two small beach settlements in the local community of Aigani in the historical and administrative region of Thessaly, Greece. The second beach settlement of Aigani, Kastri-Loutro, is located just north of Nea Mesangala.

The seaside settlement is found in the Pineios river delta and is known for its wide and sandy beaches; its clean, calm waters; and its numerous beach bars and restaurants. The area around Mesangala has many natural beauties including protected wetlands and rivers as well as beach camping sites and hiking trails. Mount Olympus and its foothills are located to the northwest and Mount Kissavos to the southwest making the beaches at Nea Mesangala particularly lovely at sunset. Near by are the beautiful Vale of Tempi and the mountain village of Aigani. To the north is the region of Central Macedonia are the seaside towns of Platamona and Neoi Poroi.

See also 

 Aigani
 Kastri-Louro
 Platamona
 Neoi Poroi
 Larissa
 Katerini

References

Μesagala.gr

External links
Νέα Μεσάγκαλα on wikimapia

Populated places in Larissa (regional unit)